is a railway station located in the Iwamuro neighbourhood of Nishikan-ku, Niigata, Japan. It is operated by JR East.

Lines
Iwamuro Station is served by the Echigo Line, and is 53.8 kilometers from the starting point of the line at Kashiwazaki Station.

Layout
The station consists of one ground-level side platform serving a single bi-directional track. The station building has a waiting hall and toilets. Outside there are taxis and regular bus services.

The station is unattended. Suica farecard can be used at this station.

History
When the station opened on 25 August 1912 on the Hakusan Echigo Railway it was originally called . It had a staffed station office, four platforms, sidings and freight yards. On 1 October 1927, the Echigo line was nationalised. The station was renamed Iwamuro on  December 25, 1965.  On January 1, 1973 all freight handling ceased at the station. The sidings and two side platforms were closed and eventually removed.  On 1 April 1987 the station was transferred to JR East Japan Railways when the Japanese rail network was privatized. Beginning on 21 January  2006, passengers were able to use Suica cards at the station. On 31 March 2007, after 95 years, the staffed station office was closed. Tickets are now purchased from an automated vending machine.

Surrounding area
 
 Wanō Elementary School
 Wanō Post Office

See also
 List of railway stations in Japan

References

External links

 JR (East) Railway (Japanese)
 Video:Maki to Iwamuro

Railway stations in Niigata (city)
Railway stations in Japan opened in 1912
Stations of East Japan Railway Company
Echigo Line